This is a list of viceroyalties (namestnichestvo) of the Russian Empire.

Under Catherine II

Later

 
Subdivisions of the Russian Empire